WOTF-TV (channel 26) is a television station licensed to Daytona Beach, Florida, United States, serving the Orlando area as an affiliate of the digital multicast network Grit. The station is owned by Entravision Communications, and has a transmitter near Orange City, Florida.

History

The station began operation on July 5, 1982, as an independent station on UHF channel 43 in Melbourne under the call sign WMOD. It was owned by Press Broadcasting, and programmed a general entertainment format with an emphasis on movies and drama series, along with some game shows. The station's original studio facilities were located on Enterprise Court in Melbourne. Shows broadcast by the station in its early years included among others Ironside, Bonanza, Soap, One Day at a Time, The Joker's Wild and Tic Tac Dough. In 1984, WMOD became a more traditional independent station, and added sitcoms (such as The Brady Bunch, Happy Days, Laverne & Shirley, The Lucy Show, All in the Family, The Odd Couple and The Honeymooners) and cartoons (such as Inspector Gadget, Super Friends and He-Man).

As a result, the station received low ratings despite decent programming.

Soon afterwards, the FCC allocated a commercial license to Clermont, a western suburb of Orlando in Lake County, on UHF channel 68. Press applied for the license in 1985, and received it in March 1986. The plan was for Press Broadcasting to sell off WMOD to the Home Shopping Network at the same time as the company's new station on channel 68 was built and signed on the air. In the meantime, WMOD agreed to affiliate with HSN on a part-time basis. Initially in October 1986, WMOD began carrying HSN programming during the overnight hours. In January 1987, HSN programming was expanded to the midday hours and by the summer of 1987, the network occupied 18 hours of WMOD's daily schedule. General entertainment programming continued to run on the station evenings from 5 to 11 p.m.

The station still was unable to move its programming unit of general entertainment shows to channel 68 by the fall. Financial constraints also prevented them from moving forward. In order to finish building the new station, in January 1988, WMOD's channel 43 signal was sold to HSN affiliate company, Blackstar Broadcasting. That February, it began to run HSN full-time (except for a few hours of religious and public affairs shows on Sunday mornings), and changed its call letters to WBSF. Its cartoons and other barter shows moved to WAYK (channel 56, now WOPX-TV), another Melbourne station with an even weaker signal than channel 43 had. Other existing programming was dropped and moved in November 1988 to the newly built WKCF (channel 68, which relocated to channel 18 in 1992).

When the FCC relaxed ownership restrictions for television stations in 1996, Blackstar sold its stations, including WBSF, to Silver King Broadcasting. Barry Diller later bought the Home Shopping Network soon afterwards. After HSN bought USA Networks, a new plan for WBSF emerged. Channel 43 was to become a general entertainment independent station once again by 2002, along with other stations that were owned by USA Broadcasting. That plan, however, did not materialize, as WBSF and the other USA Broadcasting stations were sold to Univision Communications in 2001. The sale was finalized in January 2002, and the station became an affiliate of TeleFutura under the new call sign of WOTF (the WBSF calls have since been reassigned to a CW affiliate in Bay City, Michigan). In May 2010, the station began broadcasting its network programming in 1080i high definition. In January 2014, the station added subchannel network GetTV. In August 2014, Escape TV launched on 43.4.

On December 4, 2017, as part of a channel swap made by Entravision Communications, WOTF and sister station WVEN swapped channel numbers, with WOTF moving from digital and virtual channel 43 to digital channel 49 and virtual channel 26.

On October 13, 2021, Univision announced it would take over operation of WVEN, as well as Tampa Bay Univision affiliate WVEA-TV, effective January 1, 2022, coinciding with the end of licensing agreements on December 31, 2021, effectively ending WOTF's UniMás affiliation.

Technical information

Subchannels
The station's digital signal is multiplexed:

Analog-to-digital conversion
WOTF-TV ended programming on its analog signal, over UHF channel 43, on June 12, 2009, as part of the federally mandated transition from analog to digital television. The station's digital signal relocated from its pre-transition UHF channel 20 to channel 43 for post-transition operations.

Former translators
WOTF-TV also previously operated low-power analog translator stations WVCI-LP (channel 16) in Orlando and W46DB (channel 46) in Melbourne.

References

External links

Grit (TV network) affiliates
LATV affiliates
Comet (TV network) affiliates
Charge! (TV network) affiliates
Court TV affiliates
Television channels and stations established in 1982
OTF-TV
Entravision Communications stations
1982 establishments in Florida
Daytona Beach, Florida